Niels Heithuis (born 4 June 1972, Zaandam, Netherlands) is a Dutch journalist and radio presenter. Currently, he hosts an investigative news show on NPO Radio 1 and weekend breakfast on classical radio NPO Radio 4. He won the 2008 , an industry prize for best radio program.

In the 90's, Niels Heithuis worked as a reporter and presenter for the Dutch branch of Classic FM. From 2000 he was an investigative reporter for public broadcaster VARA.

Later in the decade he joined the commercial news station BNR Nieuwsradio, where he hosted the political weekend talk show, De Lobby. At the same time he was a news reporter for the station covering, inter alia, the murder of Theo van Gogh, the Hofstad terrorist group and the first anniversary of the Haiti earthquake. In 2007 he became the presenter of the evening drive time current affairs program . The show broadcast live from the USA during the 2008 elections. He left the station in 2011 and continued to be a freelance journalist for radio and television.

References

External links

 

1972 births
Living people
Dutch radio presenters
Dutch radio journalists
People from Zaanstad